Arad (אָרַד) is a surname from the Hebrew word for bronze. Notable people with the surname include:

 Atar Arad (born 1945), Israeli-American violist; older brother to Ron
 Avi Arad (born 1948), Israeli-American businessperson; current CEO of Marvel Studios
 Boaz Arad (1956–2018), Israeli visual artist
 Dori Arad (born 1982), Israeli footballer
 Maya Arad (born 1971), American-based Israeli writer
 Michael Arad (born 1969), Israeli-American architect
 Moshe Arad (1934–2019), Romanian-Israeli diplomat
 Naama Arad (born 1985), Israeli sculptor and installation artist
 Nava Arad (1938–2022), Israeli politician
 Ofri Arad (born 1998), Israeli footballer
 Ron Arad, multiple people
 Ron Arad (industrial designer) (born 1951), Israeli industrial designer, architect, and artist; younger brother to Atar
 Ron Arad (pilot) (born 1958), Israeli Air Force weapon systems officer; classified as missing in action since 1986
 Roy Arad (born 1977), Israeli journalist, poet and artist
 Shira Arad (born 1972), Israeli film editor and musical supervisor
 Uzi Arad (born 1947), Israeli strategist and scholar
 Wedem Arad (died 1314), Emperor of the Ethiopian Empire and a member of the Solomonic dynasty
 Yael Arad (born 1967), Israeli judoka and first Israeli to win an Olympic medal
 Yitzhak Arad (1926–2021), born as Iccak Rudnicki), Lithuanian-Israeli historian of the Holocaust
 Zvi Arad (1942-2018), Israeli mathematician, acting president of Bar-Ilan University, president of Netanya Academic College

See also
 Arad (given name), list of people with the given name

Hebrew-language surnames
Jewish surnames